Mukhthar Naseer is a Maldivian international footballer, who is currently plays for New Radiant SC in the Maldives.

Mukhtar is from Thoddoo, Alif Alif Atoll.

Career 
He was first noticed while playing for Rasdhoo football team in zone football tournament by Laszlo Kiss and he brought Two Kilo to Valencia.  He is best known for his dribbling skills and fast speed.

International 
He scored the winning goal for the Maldives against India in the final of the 2008 SAFF Championship. In 2014 Naseer retired from the international football.

Honours

Maldives
 SAFF Championship: 2008

References

Maldivian footballers
Maldives international footballers
1979 births
Living people
New Radiant S.C. players
Club Valencia players
Victory Sports Club players
People from Thoddoo
Association football midfielders
Club Eagles players